Cody Walker (born 10 January 1990) is an Indigenous Australian professional rugby league footballer who plays as a  and  for the South Sydney Rabbitohs in the NRL.

At representative level he has played for the Prime Minister's XIII, Country NSW and New South Wales in the State of Origin series.

Background
Walker was born in Nowra, New South Wales, Australia. He moved to Casino, New South Wales at a young age and is of Indigenous Australian descent - from Yuin and Bundjalung people. He attended Palm Beach Currumbin High School

Walker is the younger brother of former Penrith Panthers player Ryan Walker and cousin of Gold Coast Titans player Shannon Walker.

He played his junior rugby league for the Casino Cougars, before being signed by the Gold Coast Titans on a 4-year contract.

Playing career

Early career
In 2009 and 2010, Walker played for the Gold Coast Titans' NYC team playing 36 games and scoring 25 tries for 100 points.

In 2011, he followed his brother Ryan to the Penrith Panthers and played for their New South Wales Cup team, the Windsor Wolves. In 2012, he joined the Eastern Suburbs Tigers in the Queensland Cup.

After impressing in the 2012 season, he was invited to train with the Melbourne Storm in the 2013 NRL pre-season, before returning to the Titans for the 2013 season.

On 17 July 2013, he played for the Queensland Residents against the New South Wales Residents. At the conclusion of the 2013 season, he won the Queensland Cup's Best and Fairest award as well as topping the competition for points scored.

In September 2013, he signed a 1-year contract with the Melbourne Storm starting in 2014. 

On 17 June 2014, he signed a 2-year contract with the South Sydney Rabbitohs starting in 2015.

In 2015, Walker played for the North Sydney Bears in the NSW Cup.  With Walker in the side, Norths made the finals series at seasons end. Another grand final win for Walker. He collected two awards for his contributions winning Best & Fairest and Players player at Norths' end of the year presentation.

2016
He was one of the most influential players in his side's 42-10 win at Allianz Stadium. Whilst in that match, he was filling in for the suspended Luke Keary, an injury to halfback, Adam Reynolds saw Walker maintain his position. In Round 5, Walker scored his first career try against the Manly Warringah Sea Eagles in the Rabbitohs' 16-12 win at Brookvale Oval. Despite multiple strong performances for Souths, Reynolds' return in Round 7 would push Walker out of the line-up. In Round 11, Walker was brought back into the side at the surprise position of fullback. Despite having never played the position since his teen years, he managed to set-up and score a try in his team's 34-24 win over the St. George Illawarra Dragons. Afterwards, on 1 June, he re-signed with the Rabbitohs on a 2-year contract. However, it was later revealed that he never put pen to paper before the Rabbitohs made the announcement, leaving the contract up in the air. In July, he officially signed a 3-year contract with the Rabbitohs until the end of 2019. He finished the 2016 season playing 20 games, scoring 8 tries and making 12 try-assists.

2017
Walker was named in the Rabbitohs squad for the 2017 NRL Auckland Nines. On 1 May 2017, Walker was named in The NSW Country representative side to take on The NSW City representative side in the last ever City vs Country game. Walker finished the year playing all 24 games and not missing a single minute. He scored 6 tries while topping the Try Assists (18), Line Breaks (16) and Line Break Assists (20) charts for all Five-eighths.

2018
Walker played every game for Souths in 2018 scoring 12 tries as the club finished third on the table and qualified for the finals.  Souths went on to reach the preliminary final against arch rivals the Sydney Roosters but lost the match 12-4 at the Sydney Football Stadium in front of a ground record crowd of 44,380.

2019
In Round 5 against the New Zealand Warriors, Walker scored 4 tries as Souths won the match 28-24 at the Sunshine Coast Stadium.
On 27 May, Walker's good form at club level earned him selection for New South Wales against Queensland in the 2019 State of Origin series.  Following New South Wales defeat in Game 1, Walker was one of the players dropped from the team for Game 2 by coach Brad Fittler.  Walker was also one of the New South Wales players who refused to sing the Australian National Anthem before the start of Game 1.

Walker made a total of 25 appearances for Souths in the 2019 NRL season as the club finished third on the table and qualified for the finals.  Walker scored a try in the club's elimination finals victory over Manly-Warringah at ANZ Stadium.  Walker played in the club's preliminary final defeat against the Canberra Raiders at Canberra Stadium.  During the first half of the game, Walker failed to ground the ball over the line, knocked out of his grasp by a try saving tackle from Canberra player Josh Hodgson.

On 30 September, Walker was named at 5/8 for the Australia PM XIII side. On 7 October, Walker was named in the Australian side for the 2019 Rugby League World Cup 9s.  On 18 December, Walker signed a contract extension to remain at South Sydney until the end of the 2022 season.

2020
In round 12 of the 2020 NRL season, Walker scored two tries for Souths as they defeated St. George 32-24 at Kogarah Oval.

In round 20, Walker scored two tries and was man-of-the-match in South Sydney's 60-8 victory over arch-rivals the Sydney Roosters at ANZ Stadium. Peter Sterling described Walker's contribution to the unexpected victory as "the best individual performance I have seen this year" and "as near perfect as I have seen."

Walker made a total of 21 appearances throughout the season and scored ten tries.  He played in South Sydney's preliminary final defeat against Penrith as the club fell short of a grand final appearance for a third year in a row.

Walker was selected by New South Wales for the 2020 State of Origin series.  He played in all three games as Queensland upset New South Wales winning the series 2-1.

2021
In round 3 of the 2021 NRL season, Walker scored two tries in a 26-16 victory over arch rivals the Sydney Roosters.
The following week, he scored two tries in a 38-0 victory over Canterbury-Bankstown in the traditional Good Friday game.

In round 10, Walker scored two tries for South Sydney in their 32-22 victory over Cronulla-Sutherland.

In the 2021 Finals Series, Walker scored two tries for South Sydney in a 36-16 victory over Manly in the preliminary final.
On 27 September, Walker was named Dally M Five Eighth of the year.

Walker played a total of 25 games for South Sydney in the 2021 NRL season and scored 16 tries including one try in South Sydney's 2021 NRL Grand Final loss against Penrith.  In the second half, Walker threw a long pass which was intercepted by Penrith player Stephen Crichton who raced away to score a try when both teams were locked at 8-8.  Walker later redeemed himself by setting up a try late in the second half but South Sydney fell short losing 14-12.
On 1 November, Walker signed a one-year contract extension with South Sydney which would keep him at the club until the end of the 2023 season.

2022
In round 12 of the 2022 NRL season, Walker scored two tries for South Sydney in a 44-18 victory over Wests Tigers.
Walker played 27 games for South Sydney in the 2022 NRL season including all three of the clubs finals matches as they reached the preliminary final for a fifth straight season. Souths would lose in the preliminary final to eventual premiers Penrith 32-12.

In December, Walker signed a two year contract extension, keeping him at South Sydney until the end of the 2025 season.

Controversy
On 22 May 2020, Walker was given a two-match ban by the NRL and also a $15,000 suspended fine after a video emerged of him kung-fu kicking a man who was involved in a fight with another person in Casino, New South Wales. The video was recorded in December 2019, but it only became public knowledge after one of the men threatened to release it by blackmailing Walker for $20,000.

South Sydney were also fined $20,000 for not informing the NRL of the incident.

References

External links

South Sydney Rabbitohs profile
Rabbitohs profile
NRL profile

1990 births
Living people
Australian rugby league players
Bundjalung people
Indigenous Australian rugby league players
Country New South Wales Origin rugby league team players
New South Wales Rugby League State of Origin players
Eastern Suburbs Tigers players
North Sydney Bears NSW Cup players
Rugby league five-eighths
Rugby league halfbacks
Rugby league fullbacks
Rugby league players from Nowra, New South Wales
South Sydney Rabbitohs captains
South Sydney Rabbitohs players
Windsor Wolves players